James Glen Riley (born July 6, 1945) is a former American football defensive end who played professionally for the Miami Dolphins in the American Football League and in the National Football League. Riley played college football at the University of Oklahoma. He started in Super Bowl VI.

See also
 List of American Football League players

References

1945 births
Living people
American football defensive ends
American Football League players
Miami Dolphins players
Oklahoma Sooners football players
Enid High School alumni
Sportspeople from Galveston, Texas
Players of American football from Texas